Wiltz is a small impact crater in the Elysium quadrangle of Mars. It was named after the town of Wiltz, Luxembourg, in 2008.

References 

Impact craters on Mars
Elysium quadrangle